Sergey Alexeyevich Vakhrukov (born 20 June 1958 in Rybinsk) is a Russian politician, and is a former Governor of Yaroslavl Oblast (2007-2012).

On 25 December 2007, Vakhrukov was appointed to the position of Governor by Russian President Vladimir Putin. His tenure ended on 25 August 2012, and Sergey Yastrubov succeeded him beginning 28 August 2012. Yastrubov's term of governorship ended on 28 July 2016, and he was followed by Dmitry Mironov who entered office on the same day.

References

1958 births
Living people
Governors of Yaroslavl Oblast
Members of the Federation Council of Russia (1996–2000)
People from Rybinsk
United Russia politicians
21st-century Russian politicians
Russian State University for the Humanities alumni